"There is a green hill far away" is a Christian hymn, originally written as a children's hymn but now usually sung for Passiontide. The words are by Cecil Frances Alexander, and the most popular tune by William Horsley.

History
The text was first published in Hymns for Little Children (1848), and the profound but simple text reflects well on this original purpose. The hymn would become popular after its publication in the 1868 appendix to the first edition of Hymns Ancient and Modern, paired with the tune "Horsley". The writer's husband considered it among the best of those written by his wife, with later assessments agreeing on the matter, one early 20th century noting the fine poetic skill of the poet and proclaiming that "she surpassed all other writers of sacred song in meeting a growing demand for children’s hymns". French composer Charles Gounod, who composed a musical setting on the hymn's text in 1871,
reportedly considered that it was "the most perfect hymn in the English language", due in part to its striking simplicity.

Despite the apparent simplicity, the text remains well known today due to its "clear presentation of the redemptive work of Christ". It appeared in later influential publications such as The English Hymnal (1906) and remains popular to this day, appearing in most compilations, scholar John Richard Watson noting that, since the time of its first publication, "it would be hard to find a major hymn book that has not included it".

Text
The text is in five common metre stanzas. It is based upon the words "Suffered under Pontius Pilate, was crucified, dead, and buried," of the Apostles' Creed, and is an example of a metric paraphrase of the Creed where each article is extended to form a complete hymn. It can be summarised as a "touching" description of Christ dying for the sins of men and giving his "redeeming blood" to "save us all".

The first stanza refers to Golgotha (Calvary). According to legend, the author often went past a "green hill" when walking from her home to Derry, and she might have associated this with the distant – both physically and temporally – location of the Crucifixion. "Without" in the second line is usually taken to mean "outside", and some hymnals make this change explicitly.

The third stanza talks of the forgiveness of sin (c.f.), through which Man is made good, framing this as the gateway to Heaven, an imagery continued in the fourth stanza.

The final stanza is a fitting emotional conclusion to the text, and the repetition of the word "dearly" here refers has a double meaning: "that Christ loved mankind dearly, and in a way that cost Him dearly". The concluding line is a clear call to the Biblical instruction to "love the Lord your God with all your heart and with all your soul and with all your might".

Tune
The most common tune is "Horsley", named after its author, William Horsley. It was first published as a four-part setting with figured bass in collection Twenty Four Psalm Tunes and Eight Chants (London: Addison & Hodson, 1844). The original harmonisation was kept in the 1868 Hymns Ancient and Moderns publication, and has endured ever since. The following setting is transcribed from The English Hymnal (1906):

In the United States, the hymn is also frequently sung to the tune "Green Hill" by gospel composer George C. Stebbins. It was originally intended as a setting for the hymn's text and published in Gospel Hymns No. 3 (Chicago: Biglow & Main, 1878). This setting uses the final stanza as a refrain. In mostly step-wise melodic motion, it features a slow harmonic rhythm which eventually leads to a summit in the final line.

Another alternative is "Meditation" by John H. Gower, published in An Evening Service Book for Evensong, Missions, Sunday Schools, Family Prayer, etc. (Denver: Denver Music Pub., 1891) where it is set to both this text and "There is a fountain filled with blood" by William Cowper.

References

External links
"There is a green hill" sung by The Gesualdo Six

1838 songs
English Christian hymns
Hymns in The English Hymnal